Renaud Guigue (born 14 August 1979) is a French professional rugby league footballer who previously played for the Catalans Dragons in the Super League competition. He is the son of Jacques Guigue, who was also a French rugby league international.
Guigue was included on the 2001 French rugby league tour of New Zealand and Papua New Guinea.

He was named in the France training squad for the 2008 Rugby League World Cup but did not make the final squad.

During Richard Agar's spell as France head coach, Renaud took charge for one fixture in the 68–8 defeat of Serbia in Perpignan on 22 May 2015.

As of 2018, he is coach of Sporting Olympique Avignon

References

1979 births
Living people
Catalans Dragons players
France national rugby league team coaches
France national rugby league team players
French rugby league players
Rugby league wingers
Sporting Olympique Avignon coaches
Sporting Olympique Avignon players
Rugby articles needing expert attention